The 2014 Four Continents Figure Skating Championships was an international figure skating competition in the 2013–14 season. It was held at the Taipei Arena in Taipei, Taiwan  on January 20–26. Medals were awarded in the disciplines of men's singles, ladies' singles, pair skating, and ice dancing.

The event featured a total of 94 athletes from 15 nations from North America, Africa, Asia, and Oceania. There were 29 competitors in the men's event and 21 competitors in the ladies' event. There was also 7 pair teams and 15 ice dancing teams.

Venues
The competition was held at the Taipei Arena. Completed at the end of August 2005, it is located on the intersection of Dunhua North Road and Section 4 of Nanjing East Road in Shongshan District. This arena is also the first international-standard competition venue with a capacity of 15,000 spectator seats in Taipei City. It is also designed to hold concerts, art performance, exhibitions, conventions, etc.

The Taipei Annex Arena was the official practice rink of the championships. It is an international-standard ice rink (30 meters x 60 meters) with a capacity of 800~1000 spectator seats. This ice rink is frozen all year round and has been used for all kind of winter sports activities (e.g. figure skating, short track speed skating and ice hockey) and also been hosted numerous local and international competitions.

The Sunworld Dynasty Hotel Taipei was the official hotel of the event. It is located in the center of financial, banking, and shopping district and the hotel is also surrounded by the MOMO Department Store. The walking distance to the event venue, Taipei Arena, is five minutes.

Qualification
Skaters were eligible for the event if they were representing a non-European ISU member nation and had reached the age of 15 before 1 July 2013 in their place of birth. The corresponding competition for European skaters was the 2014 European Figure Skating Championships. National associations selected their entries according to their own criteria but the ISU mandated that their selections achieve a minimum technical elements score (TES) at an international event prior to the European Championships.

Unlike the European event, national associations at Four Continents are all allowed three entries in each discipline, regardless of how their skaters placed at the previous year's event.

Entries

Withdrawals and replacements
Early withdrawals included Brazil's Isadora Williams and Singapore's Ceciliane Hartmann. Neither were replaced. A couple of days before the start of official practices, China's Yan Han was replaced by Guan Jinlin and Chinese Taipei's Melanie Yuung-Hui Chang withdrew and was not replaced. On January 20, Chinese pair team Yu Xiaoyu / Jin Yang withdrew as well. During the men's short program South Korea's Kim Jin-seo and the Philippines' Michael Christian Martinez withdrew from the competition.

Schedule
All times are China Standard Time (UTC+8).

Overview
None of the 2013 champions competed, electing to prepare for the 2014 Winter Olympics. Only one medalist from 2013 competed — Kanako Murakami of Japan, who won bronze in ladies' singles. Han Yan of China, who won the 2013 bronze in men's singles, was originally on the roster but was replaced.

Competition recap

Day one

Ice dancing: Short dance
The competition began with the short dance with fifteen ice dancing teams from nine nations competing. In a relatively tight field, it was a battle between the North American teams who didn't qualify for the 2014 Winter Olympics. Canada's Piper Gilles / Paul Poirier won the segment with a score of 62.38 points, 1.35 points ahead of Madison Hubbell / Zachary Donohue of the United States. Their component marks were extremely close but the Americans' Level 2 and below average execution of their sequential twizzles allowed the Canadians to take the lead. In an interview after the event, Gilles said, "I'd say this is our best performance yet. We've had a little bit of an injury earlier this year, so we've been pushed back a little bit with our training time. We finally feel like we're starting to peak and we're very happy with what we did." Hubbell stated, "Today's performance was shaky in parts. We obviously made an error during our twizzles sequences. Some things have improved. We got level four on both sides of the Finnstep and we're happy about that. All in all I think that we have improvement to make during our free dance and that’s really our strong point. So we're looking forward to tomorrow."

American dance team Alexandra Aldridge / Daniel Eaton had a strong debut at their first senior ISU Championship with a third-place finish and a score of 57.65. "Because of the quick turn around from Nationals we could come here and use our great skate and the hype from Nationals to come here and skate to the best of our ability. We feel really fortunate to be here", Aldridge commented.

Canada's Kharis Ralph / Asher Hill (53.97) and Nicole Orford / Thomas Williams (53.73) placed fourth and fifth respectively with only a 0.24 point gap between them. The American team of Lynn Kriengkrairut / Logan Giuletti-Schmitt did not obtain high levels and placed sixth with 49.55 points.

Pairs: Short program
The next event was the pairs' short program with seven teams from three nations competing. China's Sui Wenjing / Han Cong took a decisive lead, scoring 75.26 points for their program to La Strada. Executing all elements with high positive grades of execution (GOE) as well as being rewarded with the highest levels of difficulty for those elements (Level Four), they earned a 9.22 point lead over America's Alexa Scimeca / Chris Knierim. After competing, Han said, "Even though we got a really high score today, we thought we were not even close to perfect. I thought that the quality of the elements still could be improved. Our strategy for this season was to showcase a more mature side of us with refined movements and a dramatic storyline." Scimeca stated, "Honestly, we struggled a lot this season with our short program and this was our last one for the season and goal was to make it the best, so we're really proud that we did. I was actually nervous, but my difference was that I tried not to hold back."

Americans Tarah Kayne / Daniel O'Shea took the third spot with a score of 62.05 points. Kayne stated, "Our placement is surprising, however, how we skated to us isn't a surprise. We train every day a certain way. Today we went out and put out what we train. It's a good feeling to put out what you train and to feel strong on the ice." 2013 World Junior champions Haven Denney / Brandon Frazier finished fourth with 58.57 points, in striking distance of the podium. The remaining Canadian and Chinese teams rounded out the field.

Men: Short program
The final event of the day was the men's short program. In a narrow field, Japan's Takahito Mura won the segment with a 4t, 3A, and 3Lz combo and solid component marks, earning 84.21 points. Mur stated, "I couldn't qualify for the Olympic Games and originally I wasn't going to the Four Continents Championships. I was really disappointed. So when I got to go to this competition, I was really positive about it and I have been doing well. The short program was really good. Since I am here I am enjoying the practices and I when I went out to compete I was in a good mood and confident. I was really dancing without thinking about anything else. That's why the short program went really well."

Another skater who missed the opportunity to compete at the 2014 Winter Olympics was 22-year-old Richard Dornbush from Carona, California. Although his 4S was deemed under-rotated, he executed his remaining jumping passes confidently and achieving the highest levels of difficulty in all his non-jumping elements to score 82.13 points, just over two points away from the lead. He also had the highest presentation score in the short program. Dornbush commented, "Going to the short, I wasn't really focused on placement or anything. I was really focused on the program and I knew what I needed was a good attempt on the quad and skate the rest of the program cleanly and I was able to do that. I think that it was a good confidence boost, but mostly I think after a good short I just need to get down on my knees and focus on the long."

China's Song Nan took third place. Despite high levels in his spins and step sequences and a clean 4T combination, his hiccup on his 3A cost him nearly two points and he settled for a total of 78.71 points. Song said, "I brought out my A game. The quad toe was really good, so I kind of relaxed and I stumbled on the triple Axel. I am not nervous at all for the free skating. I feel really confident."

Takahiko Kozuka (JPN) ranked fourth (76.85 points), just ahead of 2013 World silver medalist Denis Ten (KAZ) with 76.34 points while Jeremy Ten (CAN) round out the top six with 75.21 points.

Kim Jin-seo (KOR) withdrew before the segment due to injury (tendonitis in his left foot) and Michael Christian Martinez (PHI) did not appear.

Day two

Ice dancing: Free dance
The second day of competition began with the free dance, with Canadians Piper Gilles / Paul Poirier and Americans Madison Hubbell / Zachary Donohue battling for the gold. Skating to "Nocturne into Bohemian Rhapsody", Hubbell/Donohue won the free dance by nearly six points. Receiving the highest levels of difficulty for all their elements (except their combination spin and one of their step sequences), as well as high grades of execution (GOE), the American team coached by Pasquale Camerlengo and Anjelika Krylova earned a personal best score of 97.20 points and an overall total of 158.25 points. After the event, Hubbell stated, "It means a lot. We've learned a tremendous amount about our partnership this season. We had a pretty stellar year our first year together and since then it has been a little bit of a struggle to find our way. I feel that we finally have proven ourselves as a strong, consistent team that deserves to be at the top. We can't wait until next season and keep pushing higher."

Gilles / Poirier also had a strong free dance, skating to music from the "Hitchcock" soundtrack. Despite earning similar PCS as Hubbell/Donohue, they lost valuable levels in both required step sequences, costing them nearly six points. They earned 91.33 points for the segment and a total of 153.71 points. Poirier commented, "We've had a seasons best in both programs, that's definitely more than we can ask for. I think today the performance was a bit tight, compared to the times we've done it in the past, but there were some positive things to take out of this. We're going to take this competition with us, because it taught us a lot about resilience and about being able to come back so quickly after Nationals. Overall it’s been a really positive experience and we are pleased with the results."

The bronze medal went to 2013 World Junior bronze medalists Alexandra Aldridge / Daniel Eaton. Their Indian dance-inspired program earned them a segment score of 87.30 points, giving them a total competition score of 144.95. Aldridge stated, "We're so excited and so honored to just be on the podium. We couldn't ask for much more, this being our first season as a senior team."

Canada's Kharis Ralph / Asher Hill remained in fourth place with a total of 137.03 points while fellow Canadians Nicole Orford / Thomas Williams came fifth (total of 133.42 points) ahead of Lynn Kriengkrairut / Logan Giuletti-Schmitt of the United States who finished sixth with a total of 130.05 points. The highest-ranked team from outside North America was Australia's Danielle O'Brien / Gregory Merriman who moved up from tenth in the short dance into seventh place after the free dance, scoring a total of 121.44 points.

Ladies: Short program
The final event of the day was the ladies' short program with 21 skaters from eleven nations competing. Japan's Kanako Murakami won the segment, China's Li Zijun came second, and Haruka Imai, also from Japan, took the third spot. Skating to "Violin Muse" by Ikuko Kawai, Murakami landed a 3T-3T combination, 3F, and 2A, while her spins and footwork all merited a level four. The 2013 Four Continents bronze medalist scored a season's best of 64.73 points and commented, "I didn't want to come to Four Continents but now I'm glad I came here. I don't know what's going to happen in the free skating, but I'll try my best and I'm aiming at a specific score that I have in my head."

Skating to a tango, Li produced a 3F-3T combination, 3Lz, and two level-four spins as well as level-four steps, earning a personal best of 62.84 points. She stated, "I'm really excited, because I never landed that combination in competition. I prepared a long time for the Four Continents Championships and it is thanks to my training that I was able to perform so well." Imai, who skated last, turned in a strong performance to "Song Without Words" by Felix Mendelssohn featuring a 3S-3T combination, 3Lo, and two level-four spins, obtaining a personal best as well with 62.72 points. She commented, "Even before my performance I could hear the applause and it made me feel that I'm not alone but that my fans are with me. I got more than 60 points for the first time and it was like a triumph for me."

Japan's Satoko Miyahara ranked fourth in the segment with 60.27 points while South Korea's Kim Hae-jin came fifth (57.48 points) and American Samantha Cesario placed sixth (57.40).

Day three

Pairs: Free skating
The third day of competition began with the pairs' free skating. China's Sui Wenjing / Han Cong took the Four Continents title with another decisive score, while Americans Tarah Kayne / Daniel O'Shea moved up to take the silver and team mates Alexa Scimeca / Chris Knierim dropped a notch to take third.

Skating to Kalinka, Sui / Han performed a quadruple twist, SBS 3T-2T-2T, SBS 3S, throw 3F, and throw 3S. They earned a level four for two lifts, their spins and the death spiral to score a personal best of 137.14 points. Overall, the three-time World Junior champions accumulated 212.40 points. Han commented, "Today we gave our very best performance for the audience and the judges. We are very pleased to have achieved a personal best score." Sui added, "I am very happy to have landed the triple Salchow, because in practice my success rate is not so high. I was lucky. Overall I am very pleased with our success."

Performing to Don Quixote, Kayne / O'Shea produced a SBS 3S, throw 3Lo, and throw 3S, as well as three level-four lifts, but O'Shea fell after he caught his partner on the triple twist. The Floridians scored 119.40 points for the segment and 181.45 overall to move up one spot and take silver in their debut at an ISU Championship. O'Shea stated, "We started this year with three senior Bs and medaled in all three of those. To come here and gain a medal, it feels really good to show what we can do. Hopefully there is more to come in the future." Asked about the fall after the triple twist, he said, "It is a silly mistake, not something that happens very often and I was happy to be able to come back from it. I just tripped over my own feet."

Scimeca/Knierim's program to Ever After included a high triple twist and difficult lifts, but he struggled with the SBS jumps while she stumbled on the throw triple loop. The team from Colorado Springs earned a segment score of 104.31 points and slipped to third with 170.35 points overall. Knierim commented, "We didn't put our best performance out in the free skating, so that's a little disappointing. But we had a good short. So I think overall it was an okay event for us. We're just excited to get the opportunity to come here and get the bronze medal."

2013 World Junior Champions Haven Denney / Brandon Frazier of the United States remained in fourth place with a total of 167.10 points while Canada's Natasha Purich / Mervin Tran moved up from seventh to fifth (147.80 points).

Men: Free skating
The men's free skating was the next event. Of the 24 skaters, eleven attempted quadruple jumps but few were successful. One of the skaters to land it was Japan's Takahito Mura who won the Four Continents title while teammate Takahiko Kozuka rose from fourth to earn the silver medal and China's Song Nan took the bronze. Mura's program to Shogun included a 4T, 3Lz-3T, two 3A, as well as four more triples, but the last two were somewhat shaky. The spins merited level threes and four. The 22-year-old scored a season's best for the segment, 158.35 points, and accumulated 242.56 points overall. He commented, "I truly was happy after my performance. During the six minutes warm up I was really worried. I had too much power and I tensed up. I was really tired when I did the last two jumps (in the program). Overall I was able to perform well, especially the steps and things I had to be careful about. After Nationals I forgot what it felt like to jump but at Four Continents I was able to accomplish what I wasn’t able to do at Nationals and that’s what I want to do in the future for my career."

Skating to Introduction et Rondo Capriccioso, Kozuka two-footed his opening 4T attempt that was downgraded, but he rallied to produce six triples including two 3A as well as three level-four spins. The 24-year-old won the segment with a season's best of 159.53 points and moved up to second with a total of 236.38 points. The 2011 World silver medalist said, "I had a very difficult time after I wasn't chosen for the Olympic team. I questioned why I was skating for all this time but I able to come out of it for the Four Continents. I kept thinking about my fans. There were so many people that came from Japan and I'm such a happy man to have all these fans. I felt I'm not a man if I can't perform successfully tonight."

Song completed a 4T, 3A-3T, 3A, and three more triples and two-level four spins in his program to The Mission. The 23-year-old picked up 157.38 points for his effort and claimed his first medal at a senior-level ISU championship with 236.09 points overall. He commented, "I made some mistakes on the jumps such as tripling the planned second quad. So I lost some points there. But overall I feel honored to be on the podium."

2013 World silver medalist Denis Ten placed fourth with a total of 226.37 points while Richard Dornbush of the United States dropped from second to fifth with 224.44 points and Joshua Farris came sixth (221.00 points).

Day four

Ladies: Free skating
The 2014 Four Continents Championships concluded with the ladies' free skating. Kanako Murakami of Japan claimed the gold medal while teammate Satoko Miyahara rose from fourth to take the silver medal, and Li Zijun of China took the bronze.

Skating to Papa Can You Hear Me, Murakami landed a 3T-3T combination, 3Lz, and four more triples. The three spins and the footwork earned level fours. The 19-year-old set a new personal best score of 132.18 points in the segment and accumulated a total of 196.91 points to win her first senior-level ISU Championship. Murakami said, "This is an important competition and winning here means the next step for me. I was able to do the best performance that I can do at the moment. At all other championships I have been to my score wasn't as high as I expected, even if I didn't make mistakes. I know I still have some problems I need to fix, but I was very glad I came here to Four Continents."

Miyahara delivered a strong performance to the flamenco piece Poeta, landing seven triples including a 3Lz-3T and a 2A-3T combination and earning a level four for two spins. The 15-year-old posted a personal best score of 126.26 points for the segment and a total of 186.53 points, finishing on the podium in her debut at a senior ISU Championship. She stated, "This event I was the most nerve-wracking for me. I know this will be a great start for the next season. Today's performance made me gain confidence. I didn't care about my placement. Being second doesn't really matter to me, the most important thing was to do the best I could."

Li's program to Coppelia featured five solid triples as well as level-three spins and footwork. Although she improved her season's best significantly with 118.72 points, it was not enough to hold on to second place as she earned 181.56 points overall. She said, "I missed the first triple-triple combination, and the landing of the double Axel was shaky. I have to say I was still not in my best condition. I would like to make sure to bring out the best side of me at the Olympics."

Haruka Imai (JPN) slipped from third to fourth (175.40 points overall) while Courtney Hicks (USA) moved up from seventh to fifth (169.99 points) and Kim Hae-jin (KOR) finished sixth (166.84 points).

Results

Men

Final results

Short program

Free skating

Ladies

Final results

Short program

Free skating

Pairs

Final results

Short program

Free skating

Ice dancing

Final results

 Zhao and Liu were later disqualified from the competition due to a positive doping sample from Liu.

Short dance

Free dance

Medals summary

Medalists
Medals awarded to the skaters who achieve the highest overall placements in each discipline:

Small medals awarded to the skaters who achieve the highest short program or short dance placements in each discipline:

Medals awarded to the skaters who achieve the highest free skating or free dance placements in each discipline:

Medals by country
Table of medals for overall placement:

Table of small medals for placement in the short segment:

Table of small medals for placement in the free segment:

Prize money
Prize money is awarded to skaters who achieve a top 12 placement in each discipline as follows:

References

External links
 
 
 Entries at the International Skating Union
 2014 Four Continents at the International Skating Union

Four Continents Figure Skating Championships
Four Continents Figure Skating Championships, 2014
Four Continents Figure Skating Championships
International figure skating competitions hosted by Taiwan
Sports competitions in Taipei
Four Continents Figure Skating Championships